NSW Premier Cricket (formerly known as Sydney Grade Cricket) is a cricket competition played in Sydney, Australia. The competition began in 1893 when a number of clubs that had been playing for many years on an ad hoc basis voted to create a formal competition structure.

The NSW Premier Cricket competition is generally played on Saturdays and begins in mid-September and continues until the grand final is played on the first weekend of April.  Spectators are generally few and far between at matches, mostly family members, partners or club members.  The exception to this is at T20 matches which can attract crowds into the hundreds and occasionally the low thousands. Players for the NSW team are selected from the first-grade competition.  While modern day cricketers have few breaks outside the international calendar, when they do NSW players often return to play in the first-grade competition.

History

This competition has grown substantially since its formation and by 1985 the Sydney Grade Cricket Competition encompassed 20 clubs. Since the 1940s there had been a number of club mergers (Mosman with Middle Harbour, Petersham with Marrickville and Glebe with South Sydney followed in 1965 by the forced merger of Paddington with Glebe-South Sydney to form Sydney District CC). In 1965 Sutherland joined the competition, followed by Nepean (now Penrith) and University of NSW in 1973. In 1985 Sydney District CC left the competition but 3 new clubs from the outer suburbs of Sydney joined - Fairfield, Campbelltown and Hawkesbury. In the late 1990s there was a push to remove some inner-city clubs from the competition, but although no clubs were forced out, in 2001 Randwick and Petersham-Marrickville (itself the product of a merger in 1951) decided to merge and formed the Randwick Petersham club. Some clubs were renamed to reflect their wider representation (Waverley renamed as Eastern Suburbs, Fairfield becoming Fairfield-Liverpool and Campbelltown becoming Campbelltown-Camden). Finally in 2002 Blacktown were promoted from the second-tier shires competition to bring the number of clubs back up to 20. Each of the 20 clubs fields a side in each of the five senior grades as well as a side in the Poidevin-Gray Shield and AW Green Shield junior competitions.

In recent times some clubs have started broadcasting scorecards in real-time on the Cricket Australia website.  Some clubs also have detailed video and photographs each weekend.  Most but not all clubs actively update their website and have information across a variety of social media platforms.

Sydney grade cricket also has a proud history of welcoming budding, current or former first-class and Test cricketers from around the world.  Players are primarily sourced from England's county competition.  In 2015/16, there were over 10 players in the competition plying their trade in the first-grade competition.  In the late 1990s and early 2000s Kevin Pietersen and Andrew Strauss amongst others played seasons in Sydney.  Such is the strength of the competition that some well-known players have been known to play multiple matches in second grade.

To address shortcomings in players making the transition from first-grade to State cricket, two seasons ago a different type of ball was introduced into the first-grade competition.  This ball is the same used by state players but had not previously been used due to its cost (A$150 each).  While the ball is still a four-piece ball, its seam is less pronounced and more difficult to swing.  Bowlers, in particular fast bowlers, have had to work much harder at getting wickets.  Since its introduction scores within the competition have increased.  There have been higher team and individual scores (400+ scores by teams are not the rare occurrence they once were).

In the 2016/17 season, the competition changed its name to NSW Premier Cricket. The name change was part of a Cricket Australia initiative to standardise the naming of the elite men's cricket competition within each state's capital city.

Clubs
Clubs in the 2021/22 season of NSW Premier Cricket are:
Bankstown District Cricket Club – The Bulldogs play at Bankstown Oval, one of the better first grade grounds, having hosted first class matches and women's internationals. The club has won 7 first grade premierships, the first in 1958/59 under the captaincy of Ron Briggs, and the most recent in 2015/16. Bankstown have a proud history and are among the strongest clubs.  Notable Bankstown players have included all four Waugh brothers (Steve, Mark, Dean and Danny), Jeff Thomson, Len Pascoe, Corey Richards, Mark Stoneman and Aaron Bird.
Blacktown District Cricket Club – Nicknamed the Warriors, Blacktown participated in the Sydney Shires Competition before entering the Sydney Grade competition in 2002/03. Blacktown is yet to taste success across any grade but has shown steady improvement.  Its catchment area in the North West of Sydney is among the fastest growing regions in Australia.  Their two lower-grade home grounds at Whalan are among the largest in the competition, with it reported to be larger in size than the Sydney Cricket Ground.  In recent years games have been interrupted by deadly snakes crossing into the field.  Former players include Australian off spinner Gavin Robertson, NSW paceman Don Nash and West Indian bowler Corey Collymore.  
Campbelltown-Camden District Cricket Club – Nicknamed the Ghosts, the club was formed in 1985 and won its first title (the first grade limited overs crown) in 1986/87. Since then, it has won many lower grade titles.  Like Blacktown, its local area is growing rapidly which has translated into a wealth of talent.  Past players of note include Ian Davis, Brett & Shane Lee, Michael Bevan, Corey Richards, Monty Panesar, Mark Stoneman and Ollie Pope.
Eastern Suburbs Cricket Club – Founded as the Waverley Cricket Club in 1894, it changed its name in 1996 to reflect a broader regional basis. Easts have won 8 first grade premierships, the most recent being in 2003/04. Nineteen Australian players have played for the red, white and blue of the Dolphins, including the Gregory family (Syd, Jack), Frank Iredale, Alan Kippax, Arthur Mailey, Jack Fingleton, Greg Matthews, Kepler Wessels. Current players include Brad Haddin, Nathan Bracken, Peter Nevill, Nic Maddinson and David Warner. Notable overseas players include Tony Greig, Geoff Boycott and Tim Murtagh.
Fairfield-Liverpool Cricket Club - Nicknamed the Lions and have won 2 first grade premierships since joining the Sydney Grade competition in 1985, most recently in 2005/06. Rosedale Oval, its first/second grade ground, is the largest first grade ground in Sydney.  As such, the frequency of boundaries here is notably lower which means much more running for batsmen.  The most notable former players are former Australian bowler Doug Bollinger and former NSW players Grant Lambert and Ben Rohrer. Pat Richards, a rugby league footballer for Parramatta Eels, Wests Tigers and Wigan Warriors is also a former player.
Gordon District Cricket Club - The Stags were founded in 1905 and have won 6 first grade premierships since then, most recently in 1990/91. They share their home ground of Chatswood Oval with Gordon rugby club.  Chatswood Oval is notable for being surrounded by high-rise buildings and is next to major train line. Unfortunately for the fielding team, the ball is often dispatched in the vicinity of the train line and proves rather difficult to retrieve.  Nineteen players have gone on to represent Australia, including Victor Trumper, Charlie Macartney, Bert Oldfield, Brian Taber, Ian Davis, Adam Gilchrist and Phil Emery.
Hawkesbury Cricket Club – Nicknamed the Hawks and joined the Sydney Grade competition in 1985. Their home grounds at the Bensons Lane Complex at Richmond, which includes 3 grade grounds, are among the best wickets in the Sydney Premier competition but are amongst the most oppressive grounds due to the heat (it is around 50 km inland), flies and smell (paddocks surround the ground). For teams based close to the CBD, the travel to Hawkesbury often takes close to two hours each way.  The main oval, Owen Earle Oval, has recently been upgraded with a new picket fence. Notable players: Stephen O'Keefe (NSW & Aust), Peter Forrest (NSW, QLD & Aust), John Hastings (Vic & Aust), Scott Henry (NSW & Qld), Anthony Kershler (NSW), and Arjun Nair (NSW). Hawkesbury also produce regular members of NSW under-17 and 19 teams.
Manly Warringah District Cricket Club - Founded in 1878, the Waratahs are a foundation club in the Sydney grade competition. The Waratahs have won the first grade premiership 5 times, most recently in 2014/15 and have won the club championship title a number of times in the last 15 years. Recent players include NSW captain Stephen O'Keefe, Alvin Kallicharran, Stuart Clark, Michael Bevan, Chris Green and Morne Morkel.  Manly Oval is one of the most picturesque grounds in Sydney.
Mosman Cricket Club - Nicknamed the Whales and entered the Sydney first grade competition in 1921, having played in lower grades in previous seasons. Mosman has won 5 first grade premierships, but only one (2021/22) since 1938/39. Former Australian cricket captain Allan Border is probably the most famous former Mosman player and, in recognition of his contribution, the club renamed its home ground Allan Border Oval. Former players include Australian fast bowler Brett Lee, his older brother and former NSW captain Shane, former England captain Andrew Strauss.
UTS North Sydney Cricket Club - The Bears were formed in 1893 as a foundation club in the grade competition and have won 5 first grade premierships, but none since 1931/32. The club is based at North Sydney Oval, a regular venue for first class cricket in NSW and one of the spectator's favourites given its postage stamp size and its heritage stands, capable of holding 15,000 spectators.  The club's most famous players include Sir Donald Bradman, Bill O'Reilly, Keith Miller, Stan McCabe, Stuart MacGill, Trevor Chappell, Doug Walters, Sid Barnes, Charles Macartney, Phil Marks and Kerry O'Keeffe.
Northern District Cricket Club - Nicknamed the Rangers, Northern District is home to former Australian and NSW captain Mark Taylor, Brad Haddin, Adam Gilchrist, Harry Conway, Nathan Lyon,  Chris Green, former England Internation Scott Borthwick and former Sri Lankan International All - Rounder Upul Chandana. The club has won 6 first grade premierships, most recently in 1992/93.
Parramatta District Cricket Club - Formerly Central Cumberland, the club was founded in 1843 and a foundation member of the grade competition. It claims to be the oldest existing club in NSW and the second oldest in Australia. Former players include Richie Benaud, John Benaud, Doug Walters, Ben Duckett and the winner of 4 first grade premierships, the most recent in 2017/18. Bob Simpson is a coaching advisor.
Penrith District Cricket Club - Like the local rugby league team, the Penrith District Cricket Club are known as the Panthers.  Penrith are currently under the guidance of John Benaud as their coach.  England coach, Trevor Bayliss, played his Sydney Grade Cricket career at Penrith.  Penrith won the 2008/09 club championship. Patrick Cummins also plays for Penrith, being the first test player from Penrith for some decades.  Penrith is the most inland of the 20 clubs and sits at the foot of the Blue Mountains and has won 3 first grade premierships since joining the Sydney Grade competition in 1973/74, most recently in 2018/19.
Randwick Petersham Cricket Club – Nicknamed the Randy Petes. Home of former Australian players Simon Katich, Nathan Hauritz and Usman Khawaja. England's Monty Panesar and Rory Burns have both played for the club.  Coogee Oval is one of the nicest grounds, sitting just over 100 metres from Coogee beach.  It is a lively venue with many locals and backpackers passing the ground on their way to the beach.
St George District Cricket Club – Established in 1911 but not entering the Sydney Grade competition until 1921, the club was the home of Sir Donald Bradman and Bill O'Reilly, Ray Lindwall, Arthur Morris, Brian Booth, Murray Bennett and Kerry O'Keeffe. Recent players include Moisés Henriques, Trent Copeland, Mark Stoneman, Rory Burns and Josh Hazlewood. The club became the first club to win the Sydney first grade premiership 4 times in a row. It has won 17 first grade premierships, most recently in 2012/13 and it achieved its 100th premiership in all grades in the 2009/10 season. The club celebrated its centennial during the 2010/11 season.  
Sutherland District Cricket Club – One of the newest clubs in the competition, the Sharks entered the competition in 1965 and have won 2 first grade premierships, most recently in 1997/98. Past greats include former Australian Chairman of Selectors Andrew Hilditch, John Dyson, Steve Rixon, Glenn McGrath, Stuart MacGill, Stuart Clark and Phil Jaques. It is the home club of former Australian captain Steve Smith as well as NSW batsman Nic Maddinson.
Sydney Cricket Club – A merger in 2007 between the UTS Balmain Cricket Club (a member of Grade Cricket since 1897 as Balmain) and the Sydney Cricket Ground Trust. The Tigers play out of Drummoyne Oval and have won 4 first grade premierships, most recently as Balmain in 1998/99.  Over the past decade the Tigers have occasionally played at the SCG.  The most famous players from this club are Archie Jackson, Arthur Mailey, Greg Hayne (who has scored a record 12,000 runs for the club), Graham Thorpe, Russel Arnold, Nathan Bracken, Jason Krejza, Joe Denly and Zak Crawley.  Drummoyne Oval has for many years hosted one-day matches for NSW (along with North Sydney Oval and Bankstown Oval).  
Sydney University Cricket Club - Nicknamed the Students. Founded in 1864, it was a foundation member of the grade competition in 1893. It has 9 first grade premierships, the most recent in 2016/17 and has had twenty Test players including Tom Garrett, Greg Matthews, Imran Khan, Stuart Clark, Stuart MacGill and Kevin Pietersen.  Its three home grounds are set upon Sydney University's Camperdown campus just outside the CBD.  It has been a strong club over the past decade and has been able to recruit many current first-class players. Its ability to offer educational opportunities at Sydney University to first grade players is its largest advantage.  
University of NSW Cricket Club - Nicknamed the Bumble Bees and have won 2 first grade premierships, most recently in 1980/81. Home to former Test players Geoff Lawson and Michael Slater. Entered the Grade Competition in 1973/74.  Its first grade ground is located at UNSW's Kensington campus, while its lower grade grounds are located at playing fields a few suburbs away.  Has the benefit for fielders to watch high-level gridiron matches on the adjoining field.
Western Suburbs District Cricket Club – Nicknamed the Magpies and have won 11 first grade premierships, the first 2 when the club was called Burwood, but none since 1972/73. Joined the Sydney Grade competition in 1895 as Burwood. Home of Australia cricket captain Michael Clarke and Australian players Phillip Hughes and Mitchell Starc. Wests have had a number of notable former Australian players such as Bobby Simpson, Dirk Wellham, Alan Davidson, Greg Dyer, Greg Matthews, Gary Gilmour and Dave Gilbert. Wests home ground is Pratten Park in Ashfield.

Former clubs
Sydney's suburban sprawl over the past 120 years has seen the introduction of new outer-suburban clubs and the disappearance or mergers of some inner-city clubs. The most successful club no longer in the competition is Paddington which won 9 first grade titles between 1894/95 and 1953/54 before being forced to merge with Glebe-South Sydney to form the Sydney District CC in 1965 - this merged club later left the competition in 1985. Other ex-clubs include a previous club called Sydney that won 3 titles, East Sydney (the inaugural first grade champion in 1893/94), Glebe (5 titles), South Sydney, Canterbury, Redfern, Middle Harbour, Leichhardt and Newtown. Petersham and Marrickville had each won a first grade title prior to merging to become Petersham-Marrickville. They won 4 titles as a merged outfit before merging again with Randwick, which had won 7 titles, to become Randwick-Petersham.

NSW Premier Cricket
The competition consists of 20 clubs who field one side in each of the five grades. In the 1st Grade competition, each side plays every other side over a total of 19 rounds. All other grades play only 15 rounds, thus missing out on playing 4 teams each season. The additional 4 rounds that are played by the 1st Grade sides are generally one day matches that take place on Sundays (won by Sydney University in 2010/2011).

The 2010/11 season, for all grades, included 10 two-day matches (generally played on two consecutive Saturdays), 4 one-day matches and 1 Twenty-20 match. The 1st Grade sides played an additional one-day match and 3 Twenty20 matches. The 1st Grade Draw can be found here  and the 2nd Grade draw, which is identical to the 3rd, 4th and 5th Grade draws, can be found here .

The final series generally consists of Qualifying Finals, Semi-Finals and a Final. These matches are played over two days, with the First Grade Final being played over three days. In the Qualifying Finals, the 1st placed team plays the 6th placed team, 2nd plays 5th and 3rd plays 4th. The three winning teams (or better placed team in the case of a draw) and the best placed losing team go through to the Semi-Finals.

Points are allocated to the teams according to the results of each match. These points go towards the Club Championship which is awarded at the end of the regular season.

All of the current NSW first-class cricket players are selected from their performances in Premier Cricket. This includes those players who also represent Australia although the demands of the international schedule means the Australian players rarely get to play at grade level these days.

Premiers

Poidevin-Gray Shield
The Poidevin-Gray Shield, or PG's as it is more commonly known, comprises teams who represent their grade sides in an Under 21 competition. All points received in this competition go towards the Club Championship.

A W Green Shield
The A W Green Shield, or Greenies as it is more commonly known, comprises teams who represent their grade sides in an Under 16 competition consisting of 7 preliminary rounds, qualifying finals, semi-finals and a Final.

Club Championship
Won by the club with the highest competition points in aggregate across all 5 grades plus points from the PG and Green Shield competitions. Points are only accrued across round matches and do not include finals.

For each club, each grades' points tally is multiplied by a factor for the purposes of calculating Club Championship points. A point in first grade is worth more than second grade and so on.  Due to this system, the winner of the Club Championship usually comes from a club whose first-grade team is within the top 6.  However, consistency across the top 3 grades in particular is important.

Club Championship Factors

First grade = 6 points per competition point, Second grade = 5, Third = 4,Fourth = 3, Fifth/PG/Green Shield = 2...

Records

Batting

Most Career Runs

Highest Career Average

Most Centuries in a Season

Most Runs in a Season

Highest Individual Innings

Highest Average in a Season

Highest Partnerships

Youngest to Score a First Grade Century

Oldest to Score a First Grade Century

Most Sixes in an Innings

Century in Each Innings of a Match

Bowling

Most Career Wickets

Lowest Career Average

Most Wickets in a Match

Most Wickets in a Season

Most Wickets in an Innings

Lowest Average in a Season

Youngest to Take 5 Wickets in an Innings

Oldest to Take 5 Wickets in an Innings

Double Hat Tricks

Four Wickets in Four Balls

Four Wickets in Five Balls

Five Wickets in Six Balls

Wicket Keeping

Most Dismissals in a Season

Team Records

Highest Team Innings

Lowest Completed Team Innings

Other

Youngest First Grade Player on Debut

Brothers Taking All 10 Wickets in an Innings

Brothers Scoring a Century in the Same Innings

See also 

Sydney Shires Cricket
Grade cricket for like competitions in other states
Sport in Sydney

References

8. AW Green Shield Final scorecard. http://www.premier.nsw.cricket.com.au/common/pages/public/rv/match.aspx?matchID=3177634&entityID=4

External links
 
 
Cricket NSW Official Site
Bankstown District Cricket Club Site
Blacktown Grade Cricket Club Site
Campbelltown-Camden District Cricket Club Site
Eastern Suburbs Cricket Club Site
Fairfield-Liverpool Grade Cricket Club Site
Gordon District Cricket Club Site
Hawkesbury Grade Cricket Club Site
Manly Warringah District Cricket Club Site
Mosman Cricket Club Site
North Sydney District Cricket Club Site
Northern District Cricket Club Site
Parramatta District Cricket Club Inc. Site
Penrith District Cricket Club Site
Randwick Petersham Cricket Club Site
St George District Cricket Club Inc. Site
Sutherland District Cricket Club Site
Sydney University Cricket Club Site
University of NSW Cricket Club Site
Sydney Cricket Club Site
Western Suburbs District Cricket Club Site

 
Cricket in Sydney
Grade cricket competitions in Australia
1893 establishments in Australia
Sports leagues established in 1893
Cricket in New South Wales